George Wilson Purcell (born 18 February 1905, date of death unknown) was an English professional footballer. Born in Barnsley, he played for Stockport County, Swindon Town, Exeter City and Gillingham between 1922 and 1934.

References

1905 births
Year of death missing
English footballers
Gillingham F.C. players
Stockport County F.C. players
Swindon Town F.C. players
Exeter City F.C. players
Footballers from Barnsley
Association footballers not categorized by position